Summerfield is a 1977 Australian film, directed by Ken Hannam, written by Cliff Green and produced by Patricia Lovell. It stars Nick Tate, Elizabeth Alexander, John Waters, Charles 'Bud' Tingwell, Max Fairchild and Geraldine Turner, and was filmed on location on Phillip Island and Churchill Island in Victoria.

Plot summary 
The story begins with Simon Robinson arriving in a small seaside community to take over as teacher at the local school. He makes the acquaintance of siblings Jenny and David Abbott (Alexander and Waters, respectively), and Jenny's daughter Sally, who live on the island estate of Summerfield.  The discovery that his predecessor vanished without a trace and, that Sally has a rare blood disorder lead Simon to try to uncover the truth behind the mystery.

Cast
Nick Tate as Simon Robinson
John Waters as David Abbott
Elizabeth Alexander as Jenny Abbott
Charles 'Bud' Tingwell as Dr Miller
Geraldine Turner as Betty
Max Cullen as Jim
Sheila Florance as Miss Gleeson
Michelle Jarman as Sally Abbott
Isobel Harley as Miss Tucker
Joy Westmore as Mrs Shields
Adrian Wright as Peter Flynn 
Barry Donnelly as Sergeant Potter
David Smeed as Mark
Max Fairchild as Joe Baxter

Production
Cliff Green wrote the script for Peter Weir, but he was busy on The Last Wave (1977) so Ken Hannam was hired instead.
The budget was raised within three weeks from the Australian Film Commission, Greater Union, the Victorian Film Corporation (who put in $76,500) and private investors. These were essentially the same parties who invested in Break of Day (1976).

Shooting took place at the town of Cowes on Philip Island and around Western Port Bay, Victoria starting 14 February 1977.

Hannam later said in an interview "I don't look back on Summerfield as a happy experience at all." He later apologised for statements he made in the interview.

References

External links 

Summerfield at Australian Screen Online
Summerfield at Letterbox DVD
Sumerfield at BFI
Summerfield at Oz Movies

1977 films
Australian thriller drama films
Phillip Island
Films scored by Bruce Smeaton
Incest in film
Films directed by Ken Hannam
1970s English-language films
1970s Australian films